Pope Clement XII (r. 1730–1740) created 35 cardinals in 15 consistories.

August 14, 1730

 Neri Maria Corsini

October 2, 1730

 Alessandro Aldobrandini
 Girolamo Grimaldi
 Bartolomeo Massei
 Bartolomeo Ruspoli

September 24, 1731

 Vincenzo Bichi
 Sinibaldo Doria
 Giuseppe Firrao
 Antonio Saverio Gentili
 Giovanni Antonio Guadagni

October 1, 1732

 Troiano Acquaviva d'Aragona
 Agapito Mosca

March 2, 1733

 Domenico Riviera

September 28, 1733

 Marcello Passeri
 Giovanni Battista Spínola

March 24, 1734

 Pompeio Aldrovandi
 Serafino Cenci
 Pietro Maria Pieri
 Giacomo Lanfredini

January 17, 1735

 Giuseppe Spinelli

December 19, 1735

 Infante Luis, Count of Chinchón

December 20, 1737

 Tomás de Almeida
 Henri-Osvald de la Tour d'Auvergne de Bouillon
 Joseph Dominicus von Lamberg
 Gaspar de Molina y Oviedo
 Jan Aleksander Lipski
 Rainiero d'Elci
 Carlo Rezzonico

June 23, 1738

 Domenico Silvio Passionei

December 19, 1738

 Silvio Valenti Gonzaga

February 23, 1739

 Carlo Gaetano Stampa
 Pierre Guérin de Tencin

June 15, 1739

 Marcellino Corio

September 30, 1739

 Prospero Colonna di Sciarra
 Carlo Maria Sacripante

References

Clement XII
College of Cardinals
18th-century Catholicism